Zuta may refer to:

People
Audrius Žuta (born 1969), Lithuanian footballer
Jack Zuta (1888–1930), American mobster
Leonard Zuta (born 1992), Macedonian footballer

Places
Zuta, Georgia, unincorporated community